The Tayacaja Province is one of seven provinces located in the Huancavelica Region of Peru. The capital of this province is the city of Pampas. The province has a population of 116,371 inhabitants as of 2002.

Boundaries 

North: Junín Region
East: Ayacucho Region, Churcampa Province
South: Huancavelica Province
West: Junín Region

Political division 

Tayacaja is divided into eighteen districts, which are:

 Acostambo (Acostambo)
 Acraquia (Acraquia)
 Ahuaycha (Ahuaycha)
 Colcabamba (Colcabamba)
 Daniel Hernández (Mariscal Cáceres)
 Huachocolpa (Huachocolpa)
 Huaribamba (Huaribamba)
 Ñahuimpuquio (Ñahuimpuquio)
 Pampas (Pampas)
 Pazos (Pazos)
 Quishuar (Quishuar)
 Salcabamba (Salcabamba)
 Salcahuasi (Salcahuasi)
 San Marcos de Rocchac (San Marcos de Rocchac)
 Surcubamba (Surcubamba)
 Tintay Puncu (Tintay)
 Andaymarca (Andaymarca)
 Quichuas (Quichuas)

Geography 

Other mountains are listed below:

Ethnic groups 

The people in the province are mainly Indigenous citizens of Quechua descent. Quechua is the language which the majority of the population (65.11%) learnt to speak in childhood, 34.51% of the residents started speaking using the Spanish language (2007 Peru Census).

See also 

 Inka Mach'ay
 Llaqta Qulluy
 Pirwayuq
 Tampu Mach'ay

Sources 

Provinces of the Huancavelica Region